"My Solution" is a song by the American rock band the Beach Boys that was recorded during the early sessions for their 1971 album Surf's Up. It is a novelty Halloween song that features Brian Wilson doing an impression of Vincent Price over a descending chord progression and test-tube sound effects. The recording was officially released on the 2021 compilation Feel Flows.

Background
"My Solution" was written by Brian Wilson and recorded on October 31, 1970, shortly before the sessions for the group's album Surf's Up. Photographs of the session show the band in Halloween costumes, including Wilson, whose face was painted green a la Frankenstein. Band archivist Alan Boyd said: "It’s kind of jokey track, Brian is playing a mad scientist and talking like Boris Karloff while the Beach Boys are singing (recites lyrics) 'What I have done with my solution, my instant aim to evolution.'" His colleague Mark Linett surmised, "It's just having the studio in the house, and deciding, 'Let’s do a Halloween-inspired, clubhouse kind of event.' I don’t know that it was ever intended to be released."

In a 1976 interview, Brian said: "We have a song called 'My Solution' which is a very odd song that has chromatic – strange chords, not regular triad chords. The notes are bunched up. It tells the story about how a guy found an old damsel outside his castle and decided to make her part of an experiment. ... It's about a guy who found his solution. It's a very odd, Boris Karloff eerie type of thing, so it's one of our more far out, left-field things that we've done."

Biographer David Leaf mentions "My Solution" in the 1985 edition of his 1978 biography The Beach Boys and the California Myth:

Another attempt at "My Solution" was recorded during the summer of 1980, though no vocals were recorded. This version was retitled "Song Within a Song" in medley with "Shortenin' Bread".

"Happy Days"
In 1998, Wilson reworked the melody into the verse of a new song, "Happy Days", for his solo album Imagination.

Personnel
Credits from Craig Slowinski

The Beach Boys
Al Jardine - group vocals
Bruce Johnston - group vocals
Mike Love - group vocals
Brian Wilson - group vocals, narration, Hammond organ, Moog synthesizers, drums
Carl Wilson - group vocals, electric guitars (fed through a Moog)

See also
 List of unreleased songs recorded by the Beach Boys

References

External links
 

The Beach Boys songs
Halloween songs
Songs written by Brian Wilson
Song recordings produced by Brian Wilson
The Beach Boys bootleg recordings
2021 songs